Dudek-e Vosta (also Romanized as Dūdek-e Vosţá; also known as Dodak and Dūdek) is a village in Poshtkuh-e Rostam Rural District, Sorna District, Rostam County, Fars Province, Iran. At the 2006 census, its population was 259, in 51 families.

References 

Populated places in Rostam County